= Vacant Era Film Festival =

The Vacant Era Film Festival was a film festival that took place annually in the state of Oklahoma, in the United States. The first Vacant Era Film Festival was held in the historic downtown area of Norman, Oklahoma at The Sooner Theatre on Oct 2–5, 2008. The Vacant Era Film Festival showcased independent films from all over the United States and internationally, while aggressively promoting filmmaking in Oklahoma.
